Tesse is a lake that lies in Lom and Vågå municipalities in Innlandet county, Norway. The lake is mostly located in Lom municipality, but some very small parts of the lake cross over into Vågå municipality.

See also
List of lakes in Norway

References

Vågå
Lom, Norway
Lakes of Innlandet